Christian Lange (born 27 February 1967) is a German lawyer and politician of the Social Democratic Party (SPD) who served as a member of the Bundestag from the state of Baden-Württemberg from 1998 until 2021.

Political career 
Born in Saarlouis, Saarland, Lange became a member of the Bundestag in the 1998 German federal election. He is Parliamentary State Secretary to the Federal Minister of Justice and Consumer Protection.

In June 2020, Lange announced that he would not stand in the 2021 federal elections but instead resign from active politics by the end of the parliamentary term.

References

External links 

  
 Bundestag biography 

1967 births
Living people
Members of the Bundestag for Baden-Württemberg
Members of the Bundestag 2017–2021
Members of the Bundestag 2013–2017
Members of the Bundestag 2009–2013
Members of the Bundestag 2005–2009
Members of the Bundestag 2002–2005
Members of the Bundestag 1998–2002
Members of the Bundestag for the Social Democratic Party of Germany
Parliamentary State Secretaries of Germany